The Greene County Courthouse is located at 45 North Detroit Street in Xenia, Ohio. The building was designed by Samuel Hannaford & Sons and was completed in 1902.

History
Construction of this, Greene County's third courthouse, began in 1901. The architects of the Greene County Courthouse were Samuel Hannaford and Sons, who completed the building in 1902 at a cost of $191,746. Hannaford was also the architect of the Cincinnati City Hall, which shares very similar architectural styling and was built 13 years earlier.

Clock tower
The primary feature of the building is its  clock tower. The clock is from Michigan and has a weight of 4,500 pounds inside of a frame that weighs 3,000 pounds. The clock bells ring every hour indicating the time. Before 1941, the bells were rung manually by a custodian worker each hour. The clock was electrified in 1941 and now rings on its own.

References

External links
Picture of courthouse tower
Courthouse website

Further reading
Thrane, Susan W., County Courthouses of Ohio, Indiana University Press, Indianapolis, Indiana 2000 
Marzulli, Lawrence J., The Development of Ohio's Counties and Their Historic Courthouses, Gray Printing Company, Fostoria, Ohio 1983
Stebbins, Clair, Ohio's Court Houses, Ohio State Bar Association, Columbus, Ohio 1980

Buildings and structures in Greene County, Ohio
Richardsonian Romanesque architecture in Ohio
Government buildings completed in 1902
County courthouses in Ohio
Samuel Hannaford buildings
Clock towers in Ohio
Xenia, Ohio